Tyrhee Moore is an American mountaineer and member of the first all African American team to climb Denali in 2013. Moore is a Mountaineer and Outdoor Education Advocate active with the Diversify Outdoors coalition and founder of Soul Trak Outdoors.

Biography 
Moore was born and raised in the Barry Farm neighborhood of Washington, DC. Moore was introduced to the outdoors in the 7th grade while attending a summer camp in Jackson Hole, Wyoming with the City Kids Wilderness Project, where he continues to volunteer as a mentor. In 2015, Moore graduated from West Virginia University with a Bachelor's Degree in Sport and Fitness Administration/Management.

Notable accomplishments 
 First all African American team to summit Denali. 2013

Advocacy 
 As the Founder and Executive Director of Soul Trak Outdoors, Moore actively advocates for breaking down racial barriers in the outdoor community. Moore is an active member of The Diversify Outdoors coalition.

Accolades 
 Named Backpacker Magazine Heroes of the Year 2014
 Named Outdoor Industry, Inspiration Awards 2014

Filmography 
 Expedition Denali (2014, Outside TV) 
 An American Ascent (2016, 66 minutes, George Potter & Andy Adkins)
 ′Bringing it Home′ Connecting to the Outdoors  (2019, 11:30, Scott Briscoe & James Q Martin)

References 

Living people
American mountain climbers
Year of birth missing (living people)
Sportspeople from Washington, D.C.